The flag of Pereira, capital city of the Colombian department of Risaralda.  It was adopted 27 February 1870. It consists of a yellow isosceles triangle based on the hoist side, spread through the whole length of the flag, over a red field. There is a vertical stick inside the triangle, passing through the triangle's geometric center, and topped by a Phrygian cap.

Pereira